Abkhazia is a region in South Caucasus. It is a de facto independent republic, but internationally is mostly recognized as part of Georgia. The article deals with the geography and climate of Abkhazia.

Geography
The Caucasus Mountains to the north and the northeast divide Abkhazia from Circassia. To the east, the region is bordered by Svaneti. To the southeast, Abkhazia is bounded by Samegrelo; and on the south and southwest by the Black Sea. The topography is varied as it ranges from the lowlands around the Black Sea to the high peaks in the north.

The region is extremely mountainous (nearly 75% is classified as mountains or foothills) and settlement is largely confined to the coast and a number of deep, well-watered valleys. The Greater Caucasus Mountain Range runs along the region's northern border. The Gagra, Bzyb, and Kodori Ranges branch off from the Main Caucasus Range. The highest mountain is Dombai-Ulgen.

Landscape

The landscapes of Abkhazia range from coastal forests (endemic Pitsunda pine forests near Bichvinta/Pitsunda) and citrus plantations, to eternal snows and glaciers to the north of the republic. Because of Abkhazia's complex topographic setting, most of the territory has been spared from significant human cultivation and development.  Therefore, a large portion of Abkhazia (nearly 70% of the territory) is still covered by forests today. Abkhazia is also well known for the high number of endemic species of plants that are found only in the Caucasus, only in Georgia, or only in Abkhazia. The forests of Abkhazia used to be more prevalent and have since been cleared drastically. They consisted of oak, beech, and hornbeam. Southeastern Abkhazia, a part of the Colchis Lowland, is still covered by Colchian forests (alder, hornbeam, oak, beech), or by citrus and tea plantations.

The world's deepest known cave, Krubera (Voronja) Cave, is located in Abkhazia's western Caucasus mountains.

The most common species are beech, spruce, and fir. Territory lying above  is mainly covered by eternal snows and glaciers.

Climate

Because of Abkhazia's proximity to the Black Sea, its climate is very mild, considering the northern latitude.  The Caucasus Mountains are greatly responsible for moderating the region's climate, as they shield Abkhazia from cold northerly winds.

The coastal territory rarely experiences strong frosts during the winter.

Abkhazia's highest regions have a cold, summerless climate throughout the year.

Abkhazia receives high amounts of precipitation, but is known for its unique micro-climate (transitional from subtropical to mountain) along most of its coast, causing lower levels of humidity. Some of the interior gorges that are sheltered from the moist influences of the Black Sea receive the lowest amounts of precipitation. The higher mountainous regions receive  of precipitation per year. Although there is usually no significant snowfall in the coastal regions, the mountains of Abkhazia do receive significant amounts of snow. Avalanches in the northeast sometimes pose a threat to populated areas. The climate is mild, which in the Soviet times caused it to become a popular holiday destination known as the "Georgian Riviera".

See also

References

External links 
 

 
Geography of Georgia (country)